Discrete Morse theory is a combinatorial adaptation of Morse theory developed by Robin Forman. The theory has various practical applications in diverse fields of applied mathematics and computer science, such as configuration spaces, homology computation, denoising, mesh compression, and topological data analysis.

Notation regarding CW complexes

Let  be a CW complex and denote by  its set of cells. The boundary operator is the endomorphism   of the free abelian group generated by  defined by

It is a defining property of boundary operators that . In more axiomatic definitions one can find the requirement that 

which is a consequence of the above definition of the boundary operator and the requirement that .

Discrete Morse functions

A real-valued function  is a discrete Morse function if it satisfies the following two properties:

 For any cell , the number of cells  containing  in their boundary which satisfy  is at most one.

It can be shown that the cardinalities in the two conditions cannot both be one simultaneously for a fixed cell , provided that  is a regular CW complex. In this case, each cell  can be paired with at most one exceptional cell : either a boundary cell with larger  value, or a co-boundary cell with smaller  value. The cells which have no pairs, i.e., whose function values are strictly higher than their boundary cells and strictly lower than their co-boundary cells are called critical cells. Thus, a discrete Morse function partitions the CW complex into three distinct cell collections: , where:

  denotes the critical cells which are unpaired,
  denotes cells which are paired with boundary cells, and
  denotes cells which are paired with co-boundary cells.

The fundamental result of discrete Morse theory establishes that the CW complex  is isomorphic on the level of homology to a new complex  consisting of only the critical cells. Some details of this construction are provided in the next section.

The Morse complex

A gradient path is a sequence of paired cells

The index of this gradient path is defined to be the integer

The division here makes sense because the incidence between paired cells must be . Note that by construction, the values of the discrete Morse function  must decrease across . The path  is said to connect two critical cells  if . The multiplicity of this connection is defined to be the integer . Finally, the Morse boundary operator on the critical cells  is defined by

Basic Results

Many of the familiar results from continuous Morse theory apply in the discrete setting.

The Morse Inequalities

Let  be a Morse complex associated to the CW complex . Then, for any , the following inequalities hold

, and

Moreover, the Euler characteristic  of  satisfies

Discrete Morse Homology and Homotopy Type

Let  be a regular CW complex with boundary operator  and a discrete Morse function . Let  be the associated Morse complex with Morse boundary operator . Then, there is an isomorphism of homology groups

and similarly for the homotopy groups.

Applications 
Discrete Morse theory finds its application in molecular shape analysis, skeletonization of digital images/volumes, graph reconstruction from noisy data, denoising noisy point clouds and analysing lithic tools in archaeology.

See also
Digital Morse theory
Stratified Morse theory
Shape analysis
Topological combinatorics
Discrete differential geometry

References

 
 
 
 
 

Combinatorics
Morse theory
Computational topology